The third cycle of Indonesia's Next Top Model aired weekly on Indonesian private broadcaster NET. starting November 5, 2022. All four cast of host and judges from the previous season returned in this season. Official partners for this season are Samsung Galaxy Z Flip 4 5G and beauty cosmetics, MakeOver. This season's prizes are cash amounting to hundreds of millions of Rupiahs and an all new Yamaha car unit.

The season featured an early seven episodes spin-off series titled "Road to INTM Cycle 3", alongside two other series: "Video Reaction INTM Cycle 3" and "Confession Room".  Appearing in the season was a former contestant of cycle 6 of Asia's Next Top Model, Iko Bustomi, who represented Indonesia and finished in eleventh place.

Cast

Contestants
(Ages stated are at start of contest)

Judges

 Luna Maya (host)
 Panca Makmun
 Ivan Gunawan
 Ayu Gani

Recurring cast members

 Kimmy Jayanti – Guest Judge and Mentor
 Dave Hendrik – Guest Judge
 Whulandary Herman – Guest Judge and Mentor

Episodes

Results

Call-out order 

  The contestant was originally eliminated but was saved
  The contestant quit the competition
  The contestant was absent at the panel and was safe
  The contestant was eliminated
  The contestant returned to the competition
  The contestant was a part of a non-elimination bottom two
  The contestant won the competition

Bottom two 

  The contestant was eliminated after their first time in the bottom two
  The contestant was eliminated after their second time in the bottom two
  The contestant was eliminated after their third time in the bottom two
  The contestant was eliminated after their sixth time in the bottom two
  The contestant quit the competition
  The contestant was eliminated and placed as the runner-up/s

Average call-out order
Episode 40 is not included.

Photo / video shoot guide

 Episode 1 photo shoot: Hanging on a rope ladder by the port
 Episode 3 photo shoot: Posing in a rotating wheel
 Episode 5 photo shoot: Chess pieces' duel in pairs
 Episode 7 video shoot: "Free The New You" high fashion video in a truck
 Episode 9 photo shoot: Mythical creatures in the forest
 Episode 11 photo shoot: High fashion duo with Top Model alumni
 Episode 13 photo shoot: Installation art in clear box
 Episode 15 photo shoot: Basketball editorial with Samuel Rizal
 Episode 17 photo shoot: Tea time with iguana
 Episode 19 photo shoot: Sport editorial on the mud
 Episode 21 photo shoot: Unrealistic upside down at fruit market
 Episode 23 photo shoot: "Get Out from Insecurities" while hanging mid-air in a hollow cube
 Episode 25 photo shoot: Nutriville summer beauty shot while floating on a pool in pairs
 Episode 27 photo shoot: Romantic date while featuring Yamaha Filano with Andi Sujono
 Episode 29 photo shoot: Action movie poster
 Episode 31 photo shoots: Comp cards; Diva cheerleaders
 Episode 33 photo shoot: Beauty and beyond for MakeOver while doing aerial yoga
 Episode 35 photo shoot: Bohemian family celebration portrait
 Episode 37 photo shoot: Newborn stars on theatrical rigging
 Episode 39 photo shoot:

Makeovers
In Episode 25, all eight finalists received their second makeover, with the exception of Denissa, whose hair wasn't trimmed or styled.

Supporting shows

Road to INTM Cycle 3 
Road to INTM Cycle 3 showcased the seven behind-the-scenes audition footages of 30 semi-finalists that were soon reduced into the pool of 18 final contestants. It aired weekly on NET. every Saturday and Sunday at 12.00, starting from October 8, 2022. Below is the data of the 12 contestants that did not pass the final audition.

Video Reaction INTM Cycle 3 
Video Reaction INTM Cycle 3 showcased the live reactions of Top Model alumni watching the episodes of Indonesia's Next Top Model (season 3). It aired weekly on NET. every Thursday and Friday at 19.00, starting from November 10, 2022. Ever since episode 28, Video Reaction INTM Cycle 3 only aired every Tuesday at 19.00.

Confession Room 
Confession Room showcased the vents of the contestants throughout their time quarantining at the model house. It aired weekly on NET. every Wednesday at 19.00, starting from November 9, 2022.

Controversy 
During the elimination panel in cycle 3 episode 8, Shynka and Kezia landed in the bottom two. After, Luna Maya announced that Shynka would continue the competition, leaving Kezia to be eliminated, but it was then when Shynka declared that she wanted to quit the contest. She argued about how she never felt appreciated by the judges despite the amount of hard work and effort she gave during her time from week 1 until her elimination. Shynka felt that she cannot undergo the pressure of it, which caused her to quit. Luna responded with "If the judges didn't appreciate her [Shynka's] hard work, she wouldn't even able to be on the contest." Not long after, Luna posted her daily vlog on YouTube and towards the end of her vlog, she called Shynka bego [very stupid] and mocked her decision of quitting. Luna highly received criticism for her sensitive remarks towards Shynka in her comments section, and because of that, those statements were eventually edited out from the video.

The public reaction was a mix of positivity and negativity. Though they sympathized and respected Shynka's bravery for prioritizing mental health over winning the contest, some other people sided with Luna and reasoned that "Shynka should've known better that it would of course be a tough competition and her mental well-being should be prepared before joining the contest." People replied to this comment, claiming that "Shynka has an introverted personality, so it would be hard for her to receive comments and that they shouldn't blame Shynka for it."

See also 

 Indonesia's Next Top Model

References

External links 

 
 

Indonesia's Next Top Model
2022 Indonesian television seasons